Damnacanthus is a genus of flowering plants in the family Rubiaceae. The genus is found from Assam to temperate eastern Asia.

Species
 Damnacanthus angustifolius Hayata
 Damnacanthus biflorus (Rehder) Masam.
 Damnacanthus giganteus (Makino) Nakai
 Damnacanthus guangxiensis Y.Z.Ruan
 Damnacanthus hainanensis (H.S.Lo) Y.Z.Ruan
 Damnacanthus henryi (H.Lèv.) H.S.Lo
 Damnacanthus indicus C.F.Gaertn.
 Damnacanthus labordei (H.Lèv.) H.S.Lo
 Damnacanthus macrophyllus Siebold ex Miq.
 Damnacanthus major Siebold & Zucc.
 Damnacanthus officinarum C.C.Huang
 Damnacanthus x okinawensis Hatus
 Damnacanthus tsaii Hu

References

External links
Damnacanthus in the World Checklist of Rubiaceae

Rubiaceae genera
Mitchelleae